Vicki Golden (born July 28, 1992 in San Diego, California) is an American professional Freestyle Motocross rider and the first female team member of Metal mulisha, Since beginning her career in 2000 Golden has won three consecutive gold medals in Women's Moto X Racing at the X Games. She is also the first woman to compete in a freestyle Moto X competition, earning the bronze medal in the best whip category. She currently rides a Suzuki 450/250 motocross bike.

Early career
Golden began racing at the age of seven after seeing her brother and father racing. Golden had to race with the boys because there wasn't enough girls to create a separate race class. Golden's career took off at age 16 when raced the Loretta Lynn's Amateur Motocross National Championships in Tennessee where she won the Women's Amateur National Champion title. In the same year she also earned her AMA/WMX Pro License.

Career Highlights
2008 -     Loretta Lynn's AMA Women's Amateur Champion 
 
2009 -     TransWorld Motocross Magazine's Female Motocross Rookie of the Year 
 
2011 -     Won the gold medal in the Women's Moto X Racing  in the Summer X Games

2011 -    First Female to break top 10 in AMA Arena Cross Lites Main  
 
2011 -    First female to qualify for AMA Arena Cross Premier class night show  

2012 -    Won her second gold medal in the Women's Moto X Racing in the Summer X Games

2012 -    Third consecutive gold medal in the Women's Moto X Racing in the Summer X Games
won bronze for Moto X Best Whip 

2014 -    First woman to complete Ricky Carmichael's Road to Supercross  
 
2014 -  Nominated for  an ESPY Award in 2014 for  Best Female Action Sports Athlete 

2015 -  First woman in Monster Energy AMA Supercross, an FIM World Championship, to qualify for the “Fast 40″ – the riders that transition to the night program from time qualifying – which she did for the 2015 finale.

References

Motorcycle racers from San Diego
American motorcycle racers
Female motorcycle racers
1992 births
Freestyle motocross riders
Living people
American sportswomen
21st-century American women